Macarthur is a region in the south-west part of the Greater Sydney area, in the state of New South Wales, Australia. The region includes the local government areas of the City of Campbelltown, Camden Council, and Wollondilly Shire. It covers an area of 3,067 square kilometres and has a population of close to 310,000 residents. The region geographically forms the foothills between the Blue Mountains and Southern Highlands regions.

The region is bounded at the north by Glenfield; at the south by Yanderra; at the east by the town of Appin; and at the west by the hamlet Nattai.

Most of the area is taken up by the semi-rural Wollondilly Shire; most of the population lives within the satellite city of Campbelltown and its surrounding suburbs.

The region is one of the fastest-growing regions in the Sydney metropolitan area, with many new modern suburbs sprouting up in recent decades such as Glen Alpine, Macquarie Links, Harrington Park, Blair Athol, Mount Annan, Currans Hill, Englorie Park, Picton, Oran Park, Gregory Hills, Spring Farm and Catherine Field.

Etymology 

The region is named after John Macarthur and Elizabeth Macarthur who were founders and pioneers of the Australian wool industry. Founded on land owned by the Macarthurs and surveyed by Sir Thomas Mitchell, the town of Camden was named for Lord Camden, who, during his brief tenure as Secretary of State for War and the Colonies had secured the initial land grant for John Macarthur who was then in England. The original Macarthur family property covered the three local councils (Camden Council, Campbelltown City Council and Wollondilly Shire) that are within the region.

Geography 

The region is generally regarded as the area where the city of Sydney meets rural countryside of regional New South Wales, and is considered to be part of the south west part of the Greater Sydney area. Campbelltown and Camden were once rural towns which formed the nucleus of new urban communities created following the Three Cities Structure Plan 1973.

The Wollondilly Shire which makes up the largest Southern part of the region is a mostly rural region with small scale industry and commerce. Notably, the Wollondilly supplies much of Sydney Metropolitan and surrounding areas with water from Warragamba Dam, Cataract Dam in Appin, Cordeaux Dam in Wilton and Avon and Nepean Dams even though located in the Wingecarribee Shire is accessed via road through Wollondilly's Bargo.

The region has thus far recorded two earthquakes in history – One occurring in Appin on March 17, 1999, and one in Picton on March 9, 1973. The Picton one had a damage total of $2.8 million, with some minor damage in Bowral and Wollongong. The earthquakes had a magnitude scale of 4.8 and 5.6, respectively.

Councils
The administrative towns of the Macarthur Region are:

 Campbelltown where the seat of chambers of the Campbelltown City Council is based.
 Oran Park where the seat of chambers of the Camden Council is based.
 Picton where the seat of chambers of the Wollondilly Shire Council is based.

Camden Council announced in May 2012 that it will transfer its administrative headquarters to Oran Park.

History

The history of the region begins over 40,000 years ago and is contained in the continuing culture of the Tharawal people. The land still contains reminders of their past lives in rock engravings, cave paintings, axe grinding grooves and shell middens. Their culture also remains in the surviving songs, stories and descendants. The lands of the Tharawal language Nation extended from approximately Botany Bay to Shoalhaven and to the foothills of the mountain ranges. The principal symbol of the Tharawal nation is the lyrebird.

European history began in 1788 shortly after settlement at Sydney Cove, when the colony's entire herd of cattle (four cows and two bulls) strayed from their enclosure and were lost. In 1795 a greatly enlarged herd of 61 cattle were discovered on the grassy land between the Nepean River and Georges River. This area was promptly named the "Cowpastures" – and was deemed a restricted area to provide ongoing protection for the herd; this restriction was short-lived as the herd, deemed too aggressive to be tamed, was destroyed. The early settlement of the area was described by Lachlan Macquarie in his journals, whose accounts include the description of Elizabeth Macarthur being met in a 'miserable' bark hut, the only accommodation then existing at Camden Park. In 1803, John Macarthur had been granted 5,000 acres (20 km²) at the Cowpastures and began grazing Merino sheep. His sons William and James introduced viticulture and a commercial nursery, and a successful dairy was founded by Emily Stone, James' wife.

The region is steeped in history with statesmen, adventurers, larrikins and villains all having an association with the Macarthur region which makes it a tourist destination.

Local attractions 

Major attractions of Camden are:

Australian Botanic Garden, Mt Annan, Mount Annan

Mount Annan Botanic Gardens is a  botanic garden opened in 1988. It is currently the largest botanic gardens in Australia and is administered by the Royal Botanic Gardens, Sydney. It is home to a large collection of native plants, and includes facilities such as picnic areas (with barbecues), walking trails and a restaurant.

Camden Park Estate, Camden

Camden Park Estate was the country property of Australian Wool Pioneers John Macarthur and his wife Elizabeth Macarthur, and became the principal residence of their family after John's death. Centrepiece of the original 2023.5 hectares (5000 acres) granted to Macarthur by the Governor of New South Wales, at the request of Lord Camden, is Camden Park House, designed by John Verge in the neo-Palladian style favoured by the colony's wealthy pastoral 'exclusives', and built between 1832 and 1834; Macarthur himself did not live to see the house completed. Currently, the house remains on 388.5 hectares (960 acres) of the original estate. Macarthur's descendants still reside on the house and property.

Adjacent to Camden Park, though once within its extent, is Belgenny Farm, which is popularly called the "Birthplace of Australia's Agriculture". Designed by architect Henry Kitchen, Belgenny Cottage was built c1821 and was mentioned in Kitchen's submission to Commissioner John Thomas Bigge's enquiry into the state of the colony under Governor Lachlan Macquarie. This original 'cottage ornée', which was demolished in the early 1900s and replaced with the current weatherboard structure, was used by the family when visiting the property until the construction of Camden Park House on an adjacent hilltop. John Macarthur himself died in the cottage in 1834, and was buried in the family cemetery immediately to the south. Currently, the farm is home to descendants of sheep that were brought by the Macarthurs and has a functioning vineyard that produces wine as well as orchards. A 2010 archaeological survey and dig to the north of Belgenny may have determined the location of the original 'miserable hut'.

Camden Valley Golf Resort, Catherine Field

Camden Valley Golf Resort, opened in 1964 by architect Prosper Ellis, is a popular 27 hole golf course. Facilities include a clubhouse and brasserie.

Wollondilly Shire 
Major attractions of Wollondilly are:

Sydney Skydivers at Picton
Sydney Skydivers is Australia's largest multi-state skydive operator in Australia and operates a Skydiving Centre off the Hume Highway junction off Picton. This Skydiving Centre is the closest self-contained Skydiving Centre near Sydney that does tandem and various other forms of skydiving.

The Centre is located 55min from the Sydney CBD and operates 7 days a week. The head office of Sydney Skydivers is located at 677 Tower Road Bankstown Airport. Skydiving is only from the centre at Picton.

Antill Park Country Golf Club, Picton

Antill Park Country Golf Club is the largest golf course in the Wollondilly Shire. It has 18 holes. Moreover, the Golf Clubhouse was built in 1863 by John Macquarie Antill Snr., and is historic to the local area.

Wirrimbirra Sanctuary, Bargo

Wirrimbirra Sanctuary is a small 95 hectare reserve and property that is under the authority of the National Trust of Australia that was given by Thistle Harris who opened the park in the 1960s. Thistle opened reserve as a tribute to her late husband and preserve 'Bargo Brush' plants and animals as Bargo is believed to be the first areas where colonial explorers saw the lyrebird, koala and wombat.

The sanctuary is open to the public where it promotes Australian environmental and wildlife issues, propagates Australian native plants and showcase native Australian animals. Currently, a dingo sanctuary is being constructed.

Mushroom Tunnel, Picton
 
Mushroom Tunnel is located just off the Remembrance Driveway (Old Hume Highway) heading towards Tahmoor and was built in 1867. It is considered one of the earliest pre-Federation railway tunnels in New South Wales. In 1919 the 65-metre-long tunnel fell into disuse when a new railway deviation was built. The tunnel then served as a mushroom farm and ammunition storage facility during the war years. Currently the tunnel is empty although it is popular with ghost-hunters due to many local folk tales claiming that it is haunted. Subsequently, it has been featured by both print and television media.

NSW Rail Museum, Thirlmere

Thirlmere Lakes National Park, Couridjah

Thirlmere Lakes National Park is part of the Blue Mountains Heritage Area in which the park consists of 5 important freshwaters lakes that are abundant in waterbirds and native reeds. The lakes are among the last undisturbed lakes within the proximity of Sydney and are believed to have high ecosystem-related and environmental scientific value. (For more information, see Thirlmere Lakes National Park.)

Campbelltown City
Major attractions of Campbelltown are:
 Macarthur Square, Campbelltown

Macarthur Square is the biggest shopping centre in the Macarthur region and caters for the entire region. It contains over 300 shops and includes the department stores Big W, Target and David Jones. Macarthur Square is located in the suburb of Ambarvale, New South Wales, which is about 1 km south of Campbelltown's CBD. It is located adjacent to Macarthur railway station and University of Western Sydney, Macarthur.
 Eschol Park House, Eschol Park

 Campbelltown City Arts Centre, Campbelltown

Campbelltown City Arts Centre is one of the largest art galleries and exhibitions centres in the Macarthur Region. It is home to Campbelltown Bicentennial Art Gallery, which contains both permanent contemporary art collections and temporary exhibitions. The centre also does art workshops and performing arts.

The centre is well known for promoting multicultural-themed art and Indigenous Australian art.

The Japanese Tea Garden is also found within the arts centre. It was a gift from the Japanese city of Koshigaya, the sister city of Campbelltown.

 Campbelltown Sports Stadium, Leumeah

The Campbelltown Sports Stadium caters for 21,000 and has grandstand seating for 9,000. It is one of the home stadiums for the Wests Tigers NRL Team. Moreover, the team's leagues club is located adjacent to the stadium as well as an athletics centre and large tennis court complex. Campbelltown Sports Stadium is also the home of the region's new A-League club Macarthur FC.

 Campbelltown Catholic Club, Campbelltown

Campbelltown Catholic Club is the largest club in the Macarthur Region. The club notably owns and has shares in The Cube (Campbelltown Convention Centre), Aquafit Gym and the Rydges Hotel located adjacent to the club.

Organisations and media 
 Macarthur Tourism – The official tourism organisation of the Macarthur Region. It looks after the tourism of three 3 councils of the Region; Wollondilly, Camden and Campbelltown.
 Macarthur Credit Union – The official local credit union bank that caters exclusively for the residents of the Wollondilly, Camden and Campbelltown.
 Macarthur Chronicle – A News Limited owned organisation that manage the three local edition newspapers to the specific LGAs that make up the region: Macarthur Chronicle Wollondilly, Macarthur Chronicle Campbelltown and Macarthur Chronicle Camden. The organisation is based in Campbelltown.
 C91.3 – A commercial radio station broadcasting on 91.3 FM.
 Vintage FM – A commercial radio station broadcasting on 88.7 FM.
 2MCR – A community radio station broadcasting on 100.3 FM.

Astronomy 
The Campbelltown Rotary Observatory is located at the University of Western Sydney (Campbelltown Campus) and Macarthur Astronomical Society holds public lectures at the Macarthur Astronomy Forum and public observing nights at selected locations.

References

Sources 
 The State Planning Authority of NSW, 1973, The New Cities of Campbelltown, Camden and Appin: Structure Plan.

External links 
 Macarthur Tourism official website
 Picton Chamber of Commerce

Regions of Sydney
 
South Western Sydney